The Papua New Guinea Hunters is a professional rugby league club from Papua New Guinea that participates in the Queensland Cup in Australia. They have relocated to Runaway Bay, Gold Coast for the 2021 Intrust Super Cup Season. The 2021 Intrust Super Cup will be the PNG Hunters' eighth season in rugby league's Queensland Cup after securing their future with a four-year license from 2019 until 2022. A 37-man train-on squad was announced for the pre season before it was trimmed and the final squad finalized. Doncaster RLFC agreed for Watson Boas to play with the Hunters squad until he was able to return to the United Kingdom. In partnership with PacificAus Sports( Australian Department of Foreign Affairs and Trade), Papua New Guinea Rugby Football League, PNG Hunters and QRL signed a three year agreement titled 'Growing and Supporting Rugby League in Papua New Guinea' in February which will see the PacificAus Sports and QRL assisting to develop the sport in the country by creating pathways for emerging PNG players and also develop pathways for PNG teams like the PNG Hunters Under-19s and Papua New Guinea Hunters women's  to take part in high-level Australian sporting competitions  The Hunters travelled with a 24-man squad to Queensland after six could not travel due to visa issues. Three consultants were recruited to join the coaching team in order to refine and up-skill the coaching staff through funding by PacificAus sports program.

Season summary 
 Round 1: Jokadi Bire scored his  first try for the club.
 Round 2: Edwin Ipape and Epel Kapinias scored their  first tries  for the club.
 Round 3: Samuel Yegip and Sylvester Namo scored their first tries  for the club.
 Round 4: Norman Brown and Benji Kot scored their first tries for the club.
 Round 4: Wartovo Puara played his 115th game for the Hunters equaling the most capped player record with Adex Wera for the club.
 Round 6: Wartovo Puara played his 116th game for the Hunters becoming the most capped player in the history of the club
 Round 7: Solo Wane and Emmanuel Waine scored their  first tries for the club.
 Round 14: Enoch Maki played his 95th game  for the club overtaking Willie Minoga who played 94 games for the club.
 Round 16: Ase Boas played his 116th game  for the club overtaking Adex Wera who played 115 games. Ase is now second most capped Hunter.
 Round 16: Judah Rimbu scored his first try for the club.
 Round 17: Gilmo Paul scored his first try for the club.

Milestone games

2021 squad

Squad movement

Gains

Losses

Ladder 

 The team highlighted in blue has clinched the minor premiership
 Teams highlighted in green have qualified for the finals
 The team highlighted in red has clinched the wooden spoon

Fixtures

Pre-season

Regular season

Statistics

Honours

References

2021 in Australian rugby league
Queensland Cup
2021 in rugby league by club